The New York State Register is the official journal of the New York state government that contains information on proposed regulations and rulemaking activities. The New York State Register is published weekly by the New York State Department of State's Division of Administrative Rules. The general and permanent regulations are compiled in the New York Codes, Rules and Regulations (NYCRR).

A separate procurement opportunities newsletter, The New York State Contract Reporter, contains notices of procurement contract opportunities and is published by the state Department of Economic Development (which is operationally integrated into the state Urban Development Corporation).

See also 
 New York Codes, Rules and Regulations
 Law of New York
 Federal Register
 The City Record of New York City

References

External links 
 New York State Register from the New York State Department of State
 New York State Register from West
 New York State Contract Reporter from the New York State Department of Economic Development

New York (state) law
United States state official journals